Copernicium (112Cn) is a synthetic element, and thus a standard atomic weight cannot be given. Like all synthetic elements, it has no stable isotopes. The first isotope to be synthesized was 277Cn in 1996. There are 6 known radioisotopes (with one more unconfirmed); the longest-lived isotope is 285Cn with a half-life of 30 seconds.

List of isotopes 

|-
| 277Cn
| 112
| 165
| 277.16364(15)#
| 
| α
| 273Ds
| 3/2+#
|-
| 281Cn
| 112
| 169
| 281.16975(42)#
| 
| α
| 277Ds
| 3/2+#
|-
| 282Cn
| 112
| 170
| 282.1705(7)#
| 
| SF
| (various)
| 0+
|-
| rowspan=3|283Cn
| rowspan=3|112
| rowspan=3|171
| rowspan=3|283.17327(65)#
| rowspan=3|
| α (96%)
| 279Ds
| rowspan=3|
|-
| SF (4%)
| (various)
|-
| EC?
| 283Rg
|-
| rowspan=2|284Cn
| rowspan=2|112
| rowspan=2|172
| rowspan=2|284.17416(91)#
| rowspan=2|
| SF (98%)
| (various)
| rowspan=2|0+
|-
| α (2%)
| 280Ds
|-
| 285Cn
| 112
| 173
| 285.17712(60)#
| 
| α
| 281Ds
| 5/2+#

|-
| 286Cn
| 112
| 174
|
| 8.45 s
| SF
| (various)
| 0+

Isotopes and nuclear properties

Nucleosynthesis
Superheavy elements such as copernicium are produced by bombarding lighter elements in particle accelerators that induces fusion reactions. Whereas most of the isotopes of copernicium can be synthesized directly this way, some heavier ones have only been observed as decay products of elements with higher atomic numbers.

Depending on the energies involved, the former are separated into "hot" and "cold". In hot fusion reactions, very light, high-energy projectiles are accelerated toward very heavy targets such as actinides, giving rise to compound nuclei at high excitation energy (~40–50 MeV) that may either fission or evaporate several (3 to 5) neutrons. In cold fusion reactions, the produced fused nuclei have a relatively low excitation energy (~10–20 MeV), which decreases the probability that these products will undergo fission reactions. As the fused nuclei cool to the ground state, they require emission of only one or two neutrons, and thus, allows for the generation of more neutron-rich products. The latter is a distinct concept from that of where nuclear fusion claimed to be achieved at room temperature conditions (see cold fusion).

The table below contains various combinations of targets and projectiles which could be used to form compound nuclei with Z = 112.

Cold fusion
The first cold fusion reaction to produce copernicium was performed by GSI in 1996, who reported the detection of two decay chains of copernicium-277.

 +  →  + 

In a review of the data in 2000, the first decay chain was retracted. In a repeat of the reaction in 2000 they were able to synthesize a further atom. They attempted to measure the 1n excitation function in 2002 but suffered from a failure of the zinc-70 beam.
The unofficial discovery of copernicium-277 was confirmed in 2004 at RIKEN, where researchers detected a further two atoms of the isotope and were able to confirm the decay data for the entire chain. This reaction had also previously been tried in 1971 at the Joint Institute for Nuclear Research in Dubna, Russia in an effort to produce 276Cn in the 2n channel, but without success.

After the successful synthesis of copernicium-277, the GSI team performed a reaction using a 68Zn projectile in 1997 in an effort to study the effect of isospin (neutron richness) on the chemical yield.
 +  →  + x 
The experiment was initiated after the discovery of a yield enhancement during the synthesis of darmstadtium isotopes using nickel-62 and nickel-64 ions. No decay chains of copernicium-275 were detected leading to a cross section limit of 1.2 picobarns (pb). However, the revision of the yield for the zinc-70 reaction to 0.5 pb does not rule out a similar yield for this reaction.

In 1990, after some early indications for the formation of isotopes of copernicium in the irradiation of a tungsten target with multi-GeV protons, a collaboration between GSI and the Hebrew University studied the foregoing reaction.
 +  →  + x 
They were able to detect some spontaneous fission (SF) activity and a 12.5 MeV alpha decay, both of which they tentatively assigned to the radiative capture product copernicium-272 or the 1n evaporation residue copernicium-271. Both the TWG and JWP have concluded that a lot more research is required to confirm these conclusions.

Hot fusion
In 1998, the team at the Flerov Laboratory of Nuclear Research (FLNR) in Dubna, Russia began a research program using calcium-48 nuclei in "warm" fusion reactions leading to super-heavy elements. In March 1998, they claimed to have synthesized two atoms of the element in the following reaction.
 +  →  + x  (x=3,4)
The product, copernicium-283, had a claimed half-life of 5 minutes, decaying by spontaneous fission.

The long half-life of the product initiated first chemical experiments on the gas phase atomic chemistry of copernicium. In 2000, Yuri Yukashev in Dubna repeated the experiment but was unable to observe any spontaneous fission events with half-life of 5 minutes. The experiment was repeated in 2001 and an accumulation of eight fragments resulting from spontaneous fission were found in the low-temperature section, indicating that copernicium had radon-like properties. However, there is now some serious doubt about the origin of these results. To confirm the synthesis, the reaction was successfully repeated by the same team in January 2003, confirming the decay mode and half-life. They were also able to calculate an estimate of the mass of the spontaneous fission activity to ~285, lending support to the assignment.

The team at Lawrence Berkeley National Laboratory (LBNL) in Berkeley, United States entered the debate and performed the reaction in 2002. They were unable to detect any spontaneous fission and calculated a cross section limit of 1.6 pb for the detection of a single event.

The reaction was repeated in 2003–2004 by the team at Dubna using a slightly different set-up, the Dubna Gas-Filled Recoil Separator (DGFRS). This time, copernicium-283 was found to decay by emission of a 9.53 MeV alpha-particle with a half-life of 4 seconds. Copernicium-282 was also observed in the 4n channel (emitting 4 neutrons).

In 2003, the team at GSI entered the debate and performed a search for the five-minute SF activity in chemical experiments. Like the Dubna team, they were able to detect seven SF fragments in the low temperature section. However, these SF events were uncorrelated, suggesting they were not from actual direct SF of copernicium nuclei and raised doubts about the original indications for radon-like properties. After the announcement from Dubna of different decay properties for copernicium-283, the GSI team repeated the experiment in September 2004. They were unable to detect any SF events and calculated a cross section limit of ~1.6 pb for the detection of one event, not in contradiction with the reported 2.5 pb yield by Dubna team.

In May 2005, the GSI performed a physical experiment and identified a single atom of 283Cn decaying by SF with a short half-time suggesting a previously unknown SF branch.
However, initial work by Dubna team had detected several direct SF events but had assumed that the parent alpha decay had been missed. These results indicated that this was not the case.

The new decay data on copernicium-283 were confirmed in 2006 by a joint PSI–FLNR experiment aimed at probing the chemical properties of copernicium. Two atoms of copernicium-283 were observed in the decay of the parent flerovium-287 nuclei. The experiment indicated that contrary to previous experiments, copernicium behaves as a typical member of group 12, demonstrating properties of a volatile metal.

Finally, the team at GSI successfully repeated their physical experiment in January 2007, and detected three atoms of copernicium-283, confirming both the alpha and SF decay modes.

As such, the 5-minute SF activity is still unconfirmed and unidentified. It is possible that it refers to an isomer, namely copernicium-283b, whose yield is dependent upon the exact production methods. It is also possible that it is the result of an electron capture branch in 283Cn leading to 283Rg, which would necessitate a reassignment of its parent to 287Nh (the electron-capture daughter of 287Fl).

 +  →  + x 
The team at FLNR studied this reaction in 2004. They were unable to detect any atoms of copernicium and calculated a cross section limit of 0.6 pb. The team concluded that this indicated that the neutron mass number for the compound nucleus has an effect on the yield of evaporation residues.

Decay products

Copernicium has been observed as decay products of flerovium. Flerovium currently has seven known isotopes, all but one (the lightest, 284Fl) of which have been shown to undergo alpha decays to become copernicium nuclei, with mass numbers between 281 and 286. Copernicium isotopes with mass numbers 281, 284, 285, and 286 to date have only been produced by flerovium nuclei decay. Parent flerovium nuclei can be themselves decay products of livermorium or oganesson.

For example, in May 2006, the Dubna team (JINR) identified copernicium-282 as a final product in the decay of oganesson via the alpha decay sequence. It was found that the final nucleus undergoes spontaneous fission.

 →  + 
 →  + 
 →  + 

In the claimed synthesis of oganesson-293 in 1999, copernicium-281 was identified as decaying by emission of a 10.68 MeV alpha particle with half-life 0.90 ms. The claim was retracted in 2001. This isotope was finally created in 2010 and its decay properties contradicted the previous data.

Nuclear isomerism
First experiments on the synthesis of 283Cn produced a SF activity with half-life ~5 min. This activity was also observed from the alpha decay of flerovium-287. The decay mode and half-life were also confirmed in a repetition of the first experiment. Later, copernicium-283 was observed to undergo 9.52 MeV alpha decay and SF with a half-life of 3.9 s. It has also been found that alpha decay of copernicium-283 leads to different excited states of darmstadtium-279. These results suggest the assignment of the two activities to two different isomeric levels in copernicium-283, creating copernicium-283a and copernicium-283b. This result may also be due to an electron-capture branching of the parent 287Fl to 287Nh, so that the longer-lived activity would be assigned to 283Rg.

Copernicium-285 has only been observed as a decay product of flerovium-289 and livermorium-293; during the first recorded synthesis of flerovium, one flerovium-289 was created, which alpha decayed to copernicium-285, which itself emitted an alpha particle in 29 seconds, releasing 9.15 or 9.03 MeV. However, in the first experiment to successfully synthesize livermorium, when livermorium-293 was created, it was shown that the created nuclide alpha decayed to flerovium-289, decay data for which differed from the known values significantly. Although unconfirmed, it is highly possible that this is associated with an isomer. The resulting nuclide decayed to copernicium-285, which emitted an alpha particle with a half-life of around 10 minutes, releasing 8.586 MeV. Similar to its parent, it is believed to be a nuclear isomer, copernicium-285b. Due to the low beam energies associated with the initial 244Pu+48Ca experiment, it is possible that the 2n channel may have been reached, producing 290Fl instead of 289Fl; this would then undergo undetected electron capture to 290Nh, thus resulting in a reassignment of this activity to its alpha daughter 286Rg.

Chemical yields of isotopes

Cold fusion
The table below provides cross-sections and excitation energies for cold fusion reactions producing copernicium isotopes directly. Data in bold represent maxima derived from excitation function measurements. + represents an observed exit channel.

Hot fusion
The table below provides cross-sections and excitation energies for hot fusion reactions producing copernicium isotopes directly. Data in bold represents maxima derived from excitation function measurements. + represents an observed exit channel.

Fission of compound nuclei with Z=112
Several experiments have been performed between 2001 and 2004 at the Flerov Laboratory of Nuclear Reactions in Dubna studying the fission characteristics of the compound nucleus 286Cn. The nuclear reaction used is 238U+48Ca. The results have revealed how nuclei such as this fission predominantly by expelling closed shell nuclei such as 132Sn (Z=50, N=82). It was also found that the yield for the fusion-fission pathway was similar between 48Ca and 58Fe projectiles, indicating a possible future use of 58Fe projectiles in superheavy element formation.

Theoretical calculations

Evaporation residue cross sections
The below table contains various targets-projectile combinations for which calculations have provided estimates for cross section yields from various neutron evaporation channels. The channel with the highest expected yield is given.

DNS = Di-nuclear system; σ = cross section

References 

 Isotope masses from:

 Isotopic compositions and standard atomic masses from:

 Half-life, spin, and isomer data selected from the following sources.

 
Copernicium
Copernicium